Dr. Vidya is a 1962 Hindi Black-and-white Romantic family film written by Mohan Segal and directed by Rajendra Bhatia. The film stars Vyjayanthimala in the title role and Manoj Kumar in the lead, with Leela Chitnis, Nazir Hussain, Helen, Sunder, Madan Puri, Prem Chopra and Mumtaz Begum, forming an ensemble cast. The film was produced by Mohan Segal under his own banner, Deluxe Films. The film's score was composed by S. D. Burman, with lyrics provided by Majrooh Sultanpuri and Raja Mehdi Ali Khan. While the editing was done by Pratap Dave. This story was adopted from the Marathi film Shikleli Bayko (1959) (Meaning " Educated Wife").

Plot
The movie was shot in an era when educated people in cities were getting influenced by the western culture, hence the people from rural areas who placed a lot of importance to values and culture, strongly abstained from marrying into city people's homes. Geeta (Vyjanthimala) is a girl from a well-to-do family and is well educated, her parents had brought up her with traditional values and respect for those values. After her graduation, her parents decide to marry her off with Ratan Chowdhury, (Manoj Kumar) the son of a zamindar, who had the mind frame that a highly educated wife would be incapable of handling and managing a home, especially in a joint family. Later, he marries Geeta, but his mentality and the talk of others stop him from accepting her. He disowns her and poor Geeta has to go back to her parents' house. Her father in law (Nazir Hussain) also does in a state of shock after leaving Geeta at her father's (Shivraj) place

Even after lot of insistence from her parents and friends, she refuses to remarry. Instead, she continues her studies to become a doctor. After garnering a degree in medical science, she goes back to Ratan's village as  Dr Vidya as none of the villagers had seen her during marriage ceremony. She stays at the same house of Ratan on rental basis, As he has shifted to another house .Geeta wants to clear the wrong perceptions that Ratan has about her. Ratan couldn't recognise her, as he had not even seen her face, even during marriage. He falls in love with Vidya and intends to marry her, but one day during the annual cart race, Ratan meets with an accident and suffers a very bad injury, after which needs surgery. Due to unavailability of any other doctor, Geeta has to do the job. She performs it successfully. Will Ratan accept Geeta in her new avatar?

Cast
 Vyjayanthimala as Geetha / Dr. Vidya
 Manoj Kumar as Ratan Chowdhury
 Leela Chitnis
 Nazir Hussain
 Helen
 Sunder
 Madan Puri
 Prem Chopra
  Mumtaz Begum

Soundtrack

The film's soundtrack was composed by S. D. Burman with lyrics provided by Majrooh Sultanpuri and Raja Mehdi Ali Khan.

Box office
At the end of its theatrical run, the film grossed around 80,00,000 with a net of 40,00,000, thus becoming the eighteenth highest-grossing film of 1962 with a verdict of average success at box office India. While Ibosnetwork.com had reported that the film had grossed around 50,00,000 and declared the film as the fifteenth highest-grossing film.

References

External links
 
 Dr. Vidya profile at Upperstall.com
 Dr. Vidya profile at Gomolo.com

1960s Hindi-language films
1962 films
Indian black-and-white films
Indian romantic drama films
1962 romantic drama films
Films scored by S. D. Burman